Flags of the World may refer to:

 Gallery of sovereign state flags, a list of the flags of the world
 Flags of the World (website), an online vexillogical website